Starye Atagi (Yokqa-Ataġa, Seẋa-Ataġa) is a rural locality (a selo) in Groznensky District of the Chechen Republic, Russia, located  south of Grozny, the republic's capital. Population:  

Starye Atagi is separated from Novye Atagi by the Argun River.

References

External links
Unofficial website of Starye Atagi 
Brief information on Starye Atagi 

Rural localities in Groznensky District